Oman Investment Authority is a sovereign wealth fund in Oman.
It is one of few entities where the Sultanate of Oman channels its excess oil revenues.
It was founded in 2020 by a royal decree and is a member of the International Forum of Sovereign Wealth Funds and is therefore signed up to the Santiago Principles on best practice in managing sovereign wealth funds.
Its objectives are purely financial. That means it does not invest in companies with the view of otherwise benefiting the local economy, nor other goals.

By royal decree, in June 2020, Oman Investment Fund, Oman SGRF, and other entities, were blended to form the new Oman Investment Authority.

References

External links

Oman SGRF SWFI Profile

Government of Oman
Sovereign wealth funds
Financial services companies established in 1980
Government agencies of Oman